is a Japanese film, released in 2005 and is based on the prizewinning novel of the same title written by Akiko Itoyama and directed by Ryūichi Hiroki.

Plot summary
"Kamata Town: not an ounce of chic..." "Perhaps I should move there..." So begins Yuko's story.

Yuko, is 35 years old; unemployed, single and is on medication to combat manic depression.  There are a number of men in Yuko's life:
 her college friend, Homma, now a member of parliament;
 K, a confessed pervert who she meets on the Internet;
 Yasuda, a manic depressive young gang member;
 Soichi, Yuko's cousin who separated from his wife and child, and was also dumped by his mistress.

Yuko seems to create a different persona depending on whom she is talking to at the time.  By the end of the movie, Yuko knows that she needs more than what Soichi and the other men in her life can give her.   We all need a soft life—the literal meaning of "Yawarakai Seikatsu"—once in a while, but as Yuko discovers, there's also something to be said for this hard thing called reality.

Cast
Shinobu Terajima as Yuko.
As an actress, Ms. Terajima, is the embodiment of "the present" as well as of Japanese cinema. Her humorous and at times serious performance as Yuko shows us a glimpse of a new kind of woman: being alone, yet accepting what she may want to deny and soldiering on in life.

Etsushi Toyokawa plays Yuko's cousin, Shoichi who has a credible combination of good-heartedness and unreliability.

Shunsuke Matsuoka plays Homma, Yuko's old time friend. Honma believes that true love can cure his impotence.

Tomorowo Taguchi plays a self-confessed pervert, "K". In normal life "K" is married and works as an architect.

Satoshi Tsumabuki plays Noboru, the manic depressive gang member. Yuko meets him through the Internet.

Production 
Producer:  Akira Morishige

Cinematographer: Kazuhiro Suzuki

Screenwriter: Haruhiko Arai

Original novel written by: Akiko Itoyama

==It's Only Talks message==It's Only Talk '''not only highlights the illness of manic depression, it also suggests ways to care for the patient.  The film suggests that through tender loving care, and by acknowledging their reality, and seeking help as patients, people
suffering from manic depression could get better.

 Awards 
Singapore International Film Festival Grand Prize 2006
Audience Award: Barcelona Asian Film Festival 2006
FIPRESCI Award: Brisbane International Film Festival 2005

 See also Brisbane International Film FestivalSingapore International Film Festival References 

 External links 
  Gold View Company, Ltd, International Distributor of It's Only TalkRadio interview with Film Director, Ryuichi Hiroki about his film, It's Only Talk''

Japanese drama films
2000s Japanese-language films
2005 films
Films directed by Ryūichi Hiroki
Films based on Japanese novels
Films with screenplays by Haruhiko Arai